Elections were held for Preston Borough Council in North West England, in May 2002. Held prior to the town being awarded city status, these elections took place following a boundary review which introduced new electoral wards as a consequence of population increase. Therefore, all councillors were up for election in the new wards for the first time.

For other elections to Preston Town Hall, both as a Borough and City council, see Preston local elections.

Ward Results

Ashton

Brookfield

Cadley

College

Deepdale

Fishwick

Garrison

Greyfriars

Ingol

Larches

Lea

Moor Park

Preston Rural East

Preston Rural North

Ribbleton

Riversway

St Georges

St Matthews

Sharoe Green

Town Centre

Tulketh

University

References
2002 Preston election result
 Ward results

See also
Preston (UK Parliament constituency)
Fulwood, Lancashire

2002 English local elections
2002
2000s in Lancashire